Tambaram City Municipal Corporation is the civic body administering the southern suburbs of Chennai in the Chengalpattu district of Tamil Nadu, India. It covers an area of 87.64 sq. km in the Pallavaram and Tambaram taluks adjacent to the limits of Greater Chennai Corporation, and has an estimated 2021 population of 960,887.  

It is one of the three municipal corporations located within the Chennai Metropolitan Area, the other two being the Greater Chennai Corporation and Avadi City Municipal Corporation. Tambaram is the 20th civic body to become a municipal corporation in Tamil Nadu.

Etymology 
Tambaram is a medieval town referred to as Taamapuram in an inscription of the 13th century. The word was inscribed on the walls around the sanctum sanctorum at Marundeeswarar temple in Tirukachur village, near Chengalpattu.

History
The earliest mention of Tambaram dates back to the 13th century when the word 'Taamapuram' was inscribed on the walls around the sanctum sanctorum at Marundeeswarar temple in Tirukachur village, near Chengalpattu.

Old Stone Age 
The oldest locality in the region is Pallavapuram which is considered one of the oldest inhabited places in South Asia. Pallavapuram is most commonly known today as Pallavaram.

On May 13, 1863, Robert Bruce Foote, a British geologist with the Geological Survey of India (GSI), discovered a hand axe belonging to the Lower Palaeolithic Age at Pallavaram (Pallavapuram). Since then, several Stone Age artefacts have been discovered. Most of these artefacts are currently lodged in the Egmore museum.

Early Medieval Period

Pallava Dynasty 
The oldest locality in the region, Pallavapuram, existed during the reign of Pallava king Mahendravarman I (that is, 600–630 CE). The Pallavas have left titles in early Pallava script at the cave temple in Pallavaram neighbourhood which dates back to 600 CE. The remains of a cave shrine constructed by the Pallava ruler have been found at Asthana-E-Moula Ali Dargah.

Chola Dynasty 
During the reign of Later Cholas, from 9th to 12th century CE, the region was called Churathur Nadu. Churathur Nadu was named after Thiruchuram, the present-day Trisulam. The Churathur Nadu extended from Tambaram in the south to Adambakkam and Alandur in the north. The region included the neighbourhood⁠s of Pammal, Pallavaram, and Thiruneermalai.

Colonial Period 
During the Carnatic wars in the late 17th century, Tambaram was an entrenchment camp for the British East India Company. During the 17th century, Pallavaram remained dependent upon the Portuguese colony of San Thome. DLater, the British established a cantonment at Pallavaram, supplementary to the one at St. Thomas Mount.

A wireless station was established in the early years of the 20th century. The Madras Aerodrome was opened at Pallavaram in 1929.

Post-Independence 
Prior to 1964, Tambaram was a small panchayat. In 1964, it was constituted as a Grade III Municipality comprising the Village Panchayats of Pulikoradu, Kadapperi, Tambaram, Irumbliyur, and Selaiyur.

Due to rapid development and growth of the town commercially and residentially, the Municipality was classified as a 'Selection Grade Municipality'. The extent of the municipality was 20.72 km2. The revenue villages under this municipality are Pulikoradu, Kadapperi, Tambaram, Irumbliyur, and Selaiyur. The number of households is 26,333, the number of notified slums is 17 and the number of unnotified slums is 7. The Tambaram range comprises forest lands in Nanmangalam, Madurapakkam, Tambaram, Pulikoradu, Kumili, Vandalur, Onnamancherry, Erumaiyur, Vattampakkam and Vadakupattu.

In 2009, Tambaram taluk was trifurcated into Tambaram, Sholinganallur and Alandur taluks. Clubbing all the three taluks, a new revenue division with Tambaram as headquarters was formed.

Creation of the Municipal Corporation 
The increasing population and rapid urbanisation increased the need for town planning, improved administration structure and human resource planning. These demands drove the creation of Tambaram City Municipal Corporation. The announcement to establish the Tambaram City Municipal Corporation was made by Minister for Municipal Administration K. N. Nehru in the state Assembly, on August 24, 2021 by merging five municipalities, five town panchayats and fifteen village panchayats. According to Government Order dated 20 October 2022, It is Special Grade Municipal Corporation in Category B.

Following a supreme court ruling to conduct rural local body elections by October 2021, the village panchayats elections for Pozhichalur, Cowl Bazaar, Tirusulam, Moovarasampattu, Kovilambakkam, Nanmangalam, Medavakkam, Vengaivasal, Perumbakkam, Sithalapakkam, Ottiyambakkam, Madurambakkam, Agaramthen, Thiruvancheri, Mudichur of the St.Thomas Mount panchayat union were held. As a result, the 15 village panchayats were excluded from the Government order issued by the State Government of Tamil Nadu on September 11, 2021.

The five municipalities, namely, Anakaputhur, Pallavaram, Pammal, Sembakkam and Tambaram, and five town panchayats, namely, Chitlapakkam, Madambakkam, Perungaluthur, Peerkangaranai and Tiruneermalai, were merged to form the Tambaram City Municipal Corporation.

After the tenure of existing village panchayats ends in 2026, the proposed village panchayats may get annexed into corporation limits, and may accordingly be converted into urban wards.

Zones 
When Tambaram City Municipal Corporation was established, it consisted of 70 wards under 5 zones.

Administrative Zones

Zone 1 
Zone 1 comprises 14 wards. Wards numbered 1 through 8 and 10, 11, 12, 29, 30 and 31 are included in this zone. Zone 1 Office of the Tambaram City Municipal Corporation is located at Pammal.

Zone 2 
Zone 2 comprises 14 wards. Wards numbered 13 through 21 and 9, 24, 26, 27 and 28 are included in this zone. Zone 2 Office of the Tambaram City Municipal Corporation is located at Pallavaram.

Zone 3 
Zone 3 comprises 14 wards. Wards numbered 22, 23, 25, and 34 through 44  are included in this zone. Zone 3 Office of the Tambaram City Municipal Corporation is located at Sembakkam.

Zone 4 
Zone 4 comprises 15 wards. Wards numbered 32, 33, and 49 through 61 are included in this zone. Zone 4 Office of the Tambaram City Municipal Corporation is located at Perungalathur.

Zone 5 
Zone 5 comprises 13 wards. Wards numbered 45 through 48, and 62 through 70 are included in this zone. The Zone 5 Office of the Tambaram City Municipal Corporation is located at East Tambaram.

Area Sabha 
Tambaram Corporation has 70 wards and each ward is divided into nine Area Sabhas with one member heading it. Totally, the Corporation has 630 Area Sabhas. Area Sabhas will be conducted once in three months. At least 200 residents from the ward are required to participate for conducting Area Sabha.

First Time, Area Sabhas to be conducted for all the urban local bodies on November 1 which is declared as Local Governance Day. First Area Sabha was conducted for Tambaram Corporation in Ward 6 of Zone 1 Pammal on 1 November 2022.

Administration

Corporation Commissioner 
The executive authority in Tambaram City Municipal Corporation is vested in Corporation Commissioner.

The legislative branch of Tambaram City Municipal Corporation consists of a council of elected councillors from each ward. The Legislative body is presided over by the Mayor who is indirectly elected by the councillors.

Mayor 
The Mayor is the head of the municipal corporation, but the role is largely ceremonial as executive powers are vested in the Corporation Commissioner. The office of the Mayor combines a functional role of chairing the Corporation meeting as well as a ceremonial role associated with being the First Citizen of the city.

Deputy Mayors 
Deputy Mayor is appointed by the Mayor for a five-year term.

Councillors 
The legislative branch of Tambaram City Municipal Corporation consists of a council of elected councillors from each ward.

Police 
In September 2021, the government revealed its plans of reforming the Greater Chennai City Police and setting up two new commissionerates in Tambaram and Avadi. Subsequently, Director General of Police (DGP) M. Ravi was deputed as special officers to form the Commissionerates. The new Police Commissionerates in Tambaram was formally inaugurated by the Chief Minister M. K. Stalin on 1 January 2022. Now Additional Director General of Police (ADGP) Amalraj IPS took over charge as CoP of Tambaram police commissionerate.

The Tambaram police commissionerate functions with two police districts⁠—Tambaram and Pallikaranai, comprising 20 police stations. For ease of administration, Somangalam and Manimangalam police stations from Kancheepuram district along with Otteri, Guduvanchery, Maraimalai Nagar, Thalambur and Kelambakkam police stations from Chengalpattu district have been attached to the Tambaram Police Commissionerate.

Elections

Emblem 

Emblem of Tambaram City Municipal Corporation represents Sri Ranganatha Perumal Temple which is one among the 108 Divya Desam located in Thiruneermalai in Zone 1, Indian Air Force Station located in East Tambaram in Zone 5, Madras Institute of Technology campus of Anna University, Chennai located in Zone 3 and Tambaram Railway Station which is the third terminal for Chennai City in Southern Railway along Grand Southern Trunk Road in Zone 4.

See also 
 List of municipal corporations in Tamil Nadu
 Greater Chennai Corporation
 Avadi Municipal Corporation
 Municipal governance in India

References

Municipal corporations in Tamil Nadu
Government of Chennai
|}